Stephanie Marie Herseth Sandlin (born December 3, 1970) is an American attorney, university administrator, and politician from the Democratic Party. Sandlin was first elected to Congress in a special election on July 12, 2004 and was re-elected three times before losing her seat in Congress to Republican Kristi Noem in 2010. She was the youngest female member of the House, and the first woman elected to the U.S. House of Representatives from South Dakota. Before her 2007 marriage to Max Sandlin, she was known as Stephanie Herseth. She is a Democrat and a member of the Herseth family of South Dakota.

Since 2017, she has served as president of Augustana University.

Early life and education
Stephanie Herseth was born on December 3, 1970, the daughter of Joyce (née Styles) and Ralph Lars Herseth, and was raised on her family's farm near Houghton. Her father's family had been active for two generations in South Dakota politics. Her paternal grandfather, Ralph Herseth, was the Governor of South Dakota, and her paternal grandmother, Lorna Herseth, was Secretary of State of South Dakota. Her father, Lars Herseth, served in the South Dakota State Legislature for two decades and ran for governor in 1986. Her ancestry includes German and Norwegian.

Herseth graduated from Groton High School in Groton, South Dakota. She earned her B.A. from Georgetown University in 1993; and her J.D. from Georgetown University Law Center in 1997.

Career prior to Congress
After law school, Herseth worked as a judicial law clerk to Judge Charles B. Kornmann of the United States District Court for the District of South Dakota and Judge Diana Gribbon Motz on the United States Court of Appeals for the Fourth Circuit. She worked in private practice as an attorney in Washington, D.C. and taught at the Georgetown University Law Center.

Prior to her election to the House, Herseth was Executive Director of the South Dakota Farmer's Union Foundation, and served on the Board of Directors for First Bank and Trust of Brookings, South Dakota.

U.S. House of Representatives

Committees

During her tenure in the House, Herseth Sandlin was assigned to committees of concern to her constituency in South Dakota. The Agriculture Committee affects the state's largest industry, and the Natural Resources Committee has jurisdiction over national forests in the Black Hills, as well as policies affecting the state's nine federally recognized Native American tribes. She was selected to serve on the Select Committee on Global Warming and Energy Independence based upon her work on issues related to biofuels and renewable energy in rural America.

She was a senior whip in the House of Representatives and co-chair of the Democratic conservative Blue Dog Coalition.

Voting record
Herseth Sandlin voted against the Affordable Health Care for America Act. In regard to voting against healthcare reform, she said she would "not vote for the Senate bill as is" and that she would "not vote for a package of changes that would go through the reconciliation process."

She opposed her party's leadership on some issues related to gun rights, which won her the support of the National Rifle Association. On social issues, Herseth Sandlin is pro-choice and expressed opposition to Referred Law 6, which sought to ban all abortions in her home state, including those for victims of incest and rape. She supported the Employment Nondiscrimination Act in 2007.

Early in the 2008 presidential election cycle, she supported Senator John Edwards.  On February 26, 2008, she endorsed Barack Obama for President of the United States.

Political campaigns

2002

Herseth ran unsuccessfully for the United States House of Representatives seat in the 2002 election, losing a high-profile race to Republican Governor Bill Janklow by a smaller than expected margin.

2004

After Janklow was convicted of manslaughter in a motor vehicle accident, he resigned his seat, effective January 20, 2004, triggering a special election. Herseth was selected as the Democratic nominee, and on June 1, 2004, narrowly defeated Republican state Senator Larry Diedrich with 51 percent of the vote. The victory gave South Dakota its first all-Democratic congressional delegation since 1937, with Senators Tom Daschle and Tim Johnson both Democrats.

In the regularly scheduled election in November 2004, Herseth beat Diedrich with 53.4 percent of the vote. The vote margin in June was about 3,000 votes, but by the November electionwhich included a hard-fought contest for the Senate seat held by Senate Minority Leader Tom Daschleit had grown to more than 29,000. Both the 2004 special and general elections were close compared to many other House races in the rest of the United States, and garnered national attention.

2006

In November 2006, Herseth defeated Republican challenger Bruce Whalen for her second full term. She received the second highest vote total for a Democratic candidate for the House in 2006.

2010

Herseth Sandlin was mentioned as a possible, even likely, candidate for Governor of South Dakota in 2010, but she announced on July 7, 2009, that she would seek re-election to the U.S. House of Representatives.

Prior to the 2010 Democratic primary, Kevin Weiland, a physician who had begun a campaign against Herseth Sandlin, but who had not yet filed to be on the ballot, called off his efforts. He said he had "concern for what the net effect would be on our political party retaining the seat in the next Congress, but also after receiving assurances from Stephanie that she will not vote to repeal the recently passed health care reform law." He had spoken to Democratic party leaders as well as to Herseth Sandlin before making this decision. Her opponent, Republican state Representative Kristi Noem, charged that Weiland's decision not to run was due to Herseth Sandlin trading her vote for personal gain. Herseth Sandlin strongly denied the allegation and said there was no quid pro quo arrangement between her and Weiland.

During the campaign, Noem also criticized Herseth Sandlin's husband, Max Sandlin. She said the lobbyist and former Congressman's list of clients included companies that had interests in legislation that would come before Congress, and suggested he would have improper influence because of his marriage. The Rapid City Journal editorial board stated that Herseth Sandlin should take the concerns seriously. Roll Call characterized the Republican charges as an attempt "to stoke anti-Beltway emotions". Herseth Sandlin's campaign responded that she did not allow family members to lobby her or her staff.

Herseth's campaign was hampered by the state Democratic Party's inability to field a candidate against John Thune in the U.S. Senate race; “by letting him breeze to re-election, Republicans could turn all their energy and money to the House race, and state Rep. Kristi Noem was able to unseat Rep. Stephanie Herseth Sandlin, the last best hope for a Democratic future in the state.”

Herseth Sandlin was defeated on November 2, 2010, by Noem. The final vote tally was 48.14 percent for Noem, and 45.9 percent for Herseth Sandlin.

Post-congressional career
After her defeat in the 2010 Congressional election, Herseth Sandlin joined the Washington, D.C. firm of Olsson Frank Weeda Terman Matz as a principal attorney focusing on federal laws and regulations. She told Roll Call that she might register to lobby Congress, after the expiration of the mandatory one-year waiting period which bars former members from that activity. Ultimately, she did not register as a lobbyist after the cooling off period ended.

Although Herseth Sandlin did not run in 2012, political commentators suggested that she might seek the U.S. Senate seat being vacated by Tim Johnson in 2014. Ultimately, she decided not to run, citing her son and her desire to continue in her role as Legal Counsel at Raven Industries in Sioux Falls, South Dakota.

Herseth Sandlin served briefly as an adjunct professor at the Department of Political Science at South Dakota State University. In February 2017, it was announced that she would become the 24th President of Augustana University, a liberal arts college in Sioux Falls.

Personal life
In March 2007, Herseth married Max Sandlin, a four-term Democratic Congressman from Texas and registered lobbyist with the lobbying and public relations firm Mercury, who is 18 years her senior. The couple met when Herseth first ran for Congress in 2002. He was defeated in 2004 when running for re-election.

Upon her marriage, she became known as Stephanie Herseth Sandlin. Their son, Zachary, was born in 2008.

See also
 Women in the United States House of Representatives

References

External links

 
 Profile at SourceWatch
 Professional Directory, Stephanie Herseth Sandlin, Olsson Frank Weeda Terman Bode Matz PC

|-

|-

1970 births
21st-century American politicians
21st-century American women politicians
American lawyers
American Lutherans
American people of German descent
American people of Norwegian descent
American women lawyers
Democratic Party members of the United States House of Representatives from South Dakota
Female members of the United States House of Representatives
Georgetown University faculty
Georgetown University Law Center alumni
Herseth family
Living people
People from Brown County, South Dakota
Women in South Dakota politics
American women academics
Members of the United States House of Representatives from South Dakota
Members of Congress who became lobbyists